Lunkim Seigoulun Khongsai (born 25 October 2000), commonly known by the nickname Gou Kuki, is an Indian professional footballer who plays as a central midfielder for I-League side Sudeva Delhi.

Club career
Born in Tuibuong, Manipur, Khongsai moved to Delhi in 2014 due to the violence and economic hardship. In 2017, Khongsai joined the youth academy at Sudeva. In 2019, he went to Spain and joined Tercera División side Olímpic de Xàtiva, which is affiliated with Sudeva Delhi.

On 9 January 2021, Khongsai made his professional debut for Sudeva Delhi in their opening I-League match against Mohammedan. He started and played 71 minutes as Sudeva were defeated 0–1.

In 2022–23 season, Sudeva Delhi got relegated from I-League.

Career statistics

Club

See also
 List of Indian football players in foreign leagues

References

2000 births
Living people
People from Churachandpur district
Indian footballers
Indian expatriate footballers
Association football midfielders
Sudeva Delhi FC players
I-League players
Footballers from Manipur